Wesley Marion Oler, Jr. (December 15, 1891 – April 5, 1980) was an American baseball player and track and field athlete who competed in the 1912 Summer Olympics.

Biography
He was born in Baltimore, Maryland and died in Alexandria, Virginia. In 1912 he finished 13th in the high jump competition.

While a student athlete at Yale University, he was initiated into the 1916 class of the Skull and Bones Society.

He also competed in the exhibition baseball tournament in Stockholm. It was the first appearance of baseball at the Olympics and Oler was one of four Americans who played for the Swedish team.

After working at a brokerage, he joined General Motors in 1939 and retired as Director of Public Relations in 1956.

References

External links
Sports Reference profile

1890s births
1980 deaths
American male high jumpers
Baseball players from Maryland
Olympic track and field athletes of the United States
Olympic baseball players of the United States
Athletes (track and field) at the 1912 Summer Olympics
Baseball players at the 1912 Summer Olympics
Yale University alumni
General Motors former executives